Hip Today is the second and last single from Extreme's fourth studio album Waiting for the Punchline, released in 1995. It is the last single the band released before breaking up and reforming in 2007.

As the band tried to fit into the grunge scene by changing their musical style, the album and the two singles released from it were commercial failures. After the song proved to be a failure in the charts as well, they disbanded. To date, it is their last single to chart in the UK, peaking at #44  In Australia, "Hip Today" peaked at #99.

Track listing

"Hip Today (Edit)" (Bettencourt, Cherone) - 4:17
"There Is No God (Edit)" (Bettencourt, Cherone, Badger) - 4:26
"When I'm President (LIVE)" (Bettencourt, Cherone) - 5:37
"Strutter" (Stanley, Simmons) Kiss cover - 4:40

References

1995 singles
Extreme (band) songs
Songs written by Nuno Bettencourt
Songs written by Gary Cherone
1995 songs
Music videos directed by David Dobkin